Lerista storri, also known commonly as the Mount Surprise slider or Storr's lerista,  is a species of lizard in the family Scincidae. The species is endemic to Australia.

Etymology
The specific name, storri, is in honour of Australian herpetologist Glen Milton Storr.

Geographic range
L. storri is found in Queensland in Australia.

Habitat
The preferred natural habitat of L. storri is forest.

Description
L. storri has no front legs. The back legs are rudimentary, short, and styliform.

Behaviour
L. storri locomotes by "sand swimming".

Reproduction
L. storri is oviparous.

References

Further reading
Cogger HG (2014). Reptiles and Amphibians of Australia, Seventh Edition. Clayton, Victoria, Australia: CSIRO Publishing. xxx + 1,033 pp. .
Greer AE, McDonald KR, Lawrie BC (1983). "Three New Species of Lerista (Scincidae) from Northern Queensland with a Diagnosis of the Wilkinsi [sic] Species Group". Journal of Herpetology 17 (3): 247–255. (Lerista storri, new species).
Wilson, Steve; Swan, Gerry (2013). A Complete Guide to Reptiles of Australia, Fourth Edition. Sydney: New Holland Publishers. 522 pp. .

Lerista
Reptiles described in 1983
Taxa named by Allen Eddy Greer
Taxa named by Keith R. McDonald (herpetologist)
Taxa named by Bruce C. Lawrie